Ion Stoian (born 28 November 1927) is a former Romanian communist politician who briefly served as the Minister of Foreign Affairs of Romania in 1989, during the rule of Nicolae Ceaușescu.

Life and political career
Stoian was born in Telega, Romania. He was a member of Communist Party Bureau of Grivița district of Bucharest. He served as the Deputy Minister of Foreign Trade and International Economic Cooperation from 7 April 1979 until 22 November 1985. Stoian served as the Minister of Foreign Affairs from 2 November 1989 until 22 December 1989, when the Ceaușescu regime was overthrown.

Stoian was arrested and sentenced to 14 years. He was pardoned by President Ion Iliescu and released in March 1994.

See also
Romanian Communist Party
Nicolae Ceaușescu
Foreign relations of Romania

References

Romanian Ministers of Foreign Affairs
1927 births
Romanian communists
Possibly living people